At 76 meters (250 feet) above sea level, Sand Mountain is one of the highest points in the state of Florida. Sand Mountain is located near the Floridian town of Wausau.

Sand Mountain is located just off State Road 77.

See also
List of Florida's highest points

External links
 Withlacoochee State Forest
 Florida Highest Named Summits
  Brooksville Ridge Cave

Hills of Florida
Landforms of Washington County, Florida